Miar Kola may refer to:
 Miar Kola, Sari